Dali's Car was a musical group formed in 1984 by Peter Murphy (vocalist), Mick Karn (bassist, keyboardist, guitarist, saxophonist) and Paul Vincent Lawford (rhythm construction).

History
One year after Bauhaus broke up, Murphy, after taking a hiatus from his music career, wanted to record music again. However, he had difficulties creating music at the time since his bandmates from Bauhaus had come up with the musical ideas and used them in their work. Murphy's input was limited to writing and interpreting lyrics, creating vocal rhythms, adding vocal parts into songs. Also, despite Murphy's input to the occasional sound effect on a Wasp synthesiser, playing a few percussion instruments and efforts of basic guitar, he did not play any musical instruments professionally. Murphy later explained this: "As a solo artist I had to learn to make records without this machine I had been part of. I had no skill. No idea what I should do. I was suddenly a solo person writing from where? From what perspective? So I was looking to find what I had to offer." Murphy was in need of a collaborator at the time. Around the same time, the bass player Mick Karn from the glam rock band Japan was struggling with his solo career as well when his band split up. Despite his musical ability, recorded demos and session work, Karn was struggling to get a record deal since he was mainly interested in making instrumental music rather than pop songs. In order to secure a record deal, he needed to convince a record company that his work has commercial prospects. Karn was looking for a frontman.

In 1984, Murphy and Karn formed Dalis Car. The band was formed soon after Murphy and Karn left their former bands (Bauhaus and Japan, respectively). The origins of the band started during an Murphy's interview by a Japanese journalist for the Magazine "Quiet Life", where he spoke of his admiration for Mick Karn's work and his unique bass style. The same journalist interviewed Karn a week before Murphy's interview and had Karn's telephone number. Murphy jotted Karn's number down and called Karn for a conversation. This led to a meeting and dinner in a restaurant and both discovered that they had a connection with each other. Did led to the creation of Dali's Car along with drummer, Paul Vincent Lawson. It was assumed that they took their name from a Captain Beefheart song from his album Trout Mask Replica. Despite the popular belief, this was apocryphal. Instead, the name came from a dream from Murphy's friend, where he dreamed of buying a car belonging to Salvador Dalí. There were issues and conflicts during this time. Karn explained one issue on how each of them had a different way to construct music: "There would be whole sections I'd leave for the vocals to take over the track, whereas Pete saw it from a completely different musical perspective; "Well, this is such a nice musical break I don't want to touch it."So I guess there was a certain amount of friction caused by that because we both heard the tracks in a completely different way." Another issue was their drummer, Paul Lawson. As Karn explained: "He was supposed to be the other third of the band. Originally, that was the idea. He would be playing live drums – we got on with him very well, he was very young and eager – unfortunately when we got into the studio we found that nerves took over and he couldn’t actually play so much. So we ended up having him programme most of the patterns rather than play them." Despite not touring in front of live audience due to these previous issues, they did make a performance of their single "His Box" on The Old Grey Whistle Test where they played over a backing track. One commentator mentioned their reaction to their appearance in the performance by saying: "In their sober suits they looked like investment bankers who had just had a bad day on the stock market". The group recorded only one album called The Waking Hour. The cover was the painting "Daybreak" by American artist Maxfield Parrish. The album went overbudget and was not successful and despite Karn's willingness to continue on with the group, Murphy was not interested based on the lack of success. In fact, he did not even show up when Karn established the bonus tracks for their single, where Murphy would prefer to stay in Turkey with this wife. According to Karn: "by that point it became obvious that Peter didn't want to carry on with it."

The Waking Hour
Initially, the band recorded one album, The Waking Hour (UK No. 84), and released one single, "The Judgement Is the Mirror" (UK No. 66). The cover of the album features a detail from Maxfield Parrish's seminal painting Daybreak. The recording of the album took place in unusual circumstances, as neither Karn nor Murphy spent much time together in the recording studio, preferring to send tapes back and forth between each other, to work on alone. Much of the video to the single was recorded on location in Malta.

Reunion and subsequent releases
In August 2010, Peter Murphy announced on Twitter that he and Karn were planning to head into the studio in September to begin work on the second Dali's Car album. The project was cut short, however, as Karn had recently been diagnosed with cancer. He died on 4 January 2011, thus ending the reunion. The tracks they did record—including a re-working of Artemis from The Waking Hour with newly added vocals, guitar, and drums, and renamed Artemis Rise—were released on 5 April 2012 as an EP entitled InGladAloneness. The tracks were mixed by Steve Jansen, mastered by Pieter Snapper in Istanbul, and the artwork for the EP was created by Murphy with Thomas Bak with a painting by Jarosław Kukowski. The Japanese version of the EP contains a memorial photo booklet with photos by Steve Jansen along with comments from fellow artists who have collaborated with Karn.

Artemis Rise was made available as a download through the Burning Shed MK Music store on Sunday 24 July, to commemorate what would have been Karn's 53rd birthday. The song is an updated version of the song as it appeared on The Waking Hour, with added vocals by Murphy, drums by Jansen, and guitar by Jakszyk.

Discography

Studio albums
The Waking Hour (1984) – UK No. 84

Singles
"The Judgement Is the Mirror" (1984) – UK No. 66

EPs
InGladAloneness (2012)

References 

Bauhaus (band)
English electronic music groups
English new wave musical groups
English gothic rock groups
English post-punk music groups
British musical trios
Musical groups established in 1984
Musical groups disestablished in 1984